Greece competed at the 2022 Winter Paralympics in Beijing, China which took place between 4–13 March 2022.

Competitors
The following is the list of number of competitors participating at the Games per sport/discipline.

Alpine skiing

Evangelia Nikou competed in alpine skiing.

Snowboarding

Konstantinos Petrakis competed in snowboarding. He also represented Greece at the 2018 Winter Paralympics held in Pyeongchang, South Korea.

Banked slalom

Snowboard cross

See also
Greece at the Paralympics
Greece at the 2022 Winter Olympics

References

Nations at the 2022 Winter Paralympics
2022
Winter Paralympics